Academy Glacier, is a glacier in northwestern Greenland. Administratively it belongs to the Avannaata municipality.

The glacier was named by Robert Peary after the Philadelphia Academy of Natural Sciences.

Geography 
The Academy Glacier is located inland and discharges from the Greenland Ice Sheet into the Leidy Glacier which bifurcates and has its terminus in the Academy Fjord, as well as in the Olrik Fjord as the smaller Marie Glacier.

See also
List of glaciers in Greenland
Inglefield Fjord

References

External links
The recent regimen of the ice cap margin in North Greenland

Glaciers of Greenland